The 1991–92 season was the club's 34th season in the Turkish First Football League. It was also one of the club's most successful seasons. They won the Turkish First Football League for the 10th time in team history and their 3rd consecutive title setting a franchise record, as well as a shared league record then, however Galatasaray broke this record 8 years later by winning 4 consecutive titles (1996–2000). Beşiktaş set another league record by finishing the league undefeated, with 23 wins, 7 draws and 0 losses. They also continued their record setting unbeaten streak from last year making a total of 35 games unbeaten. Also a league record. The team was considered "legendary" due to all the milestones achieved that season. In the Turkish cup, Beşiktaş defeated Aydınspor 1-0 in the quarterfinals, but lost to Trabzonspor 1-2 in the semifinals. Trabzonspor would go on to win the cup. By finishing 1st last season Beşiktaş also qualified for the European Cup. In the first round they were eliminated by PSV Eindhoven 2-3 (1-1 at home and 1-2 away). Beşiktaş played Trabzonspor for the Presidents Cup, after a loss to Trabzonspor in the semifinals of the Turkish cup, the team redeemed itself by defeating Trabzon 2-1. Beşiktaş missed the TSYD Cup by 3 points. They beat Fenerbahçe 4-1 but lost to Galatasaray 2-3.

European Cup
As the defending Turkish champions, Beşiktaş qualified for the 1991-92 European Cup.

First round

Turkish Cup
Beşiktaş wasn't able to win the Turkish Cup, losing to Trabzonspor in the semifinals.

Quarter-finals

Semi-finals

Turkish First Football League
Beşiktaş became the first team to finish 1st place undefeated. The team became "legendary" and is considered as one of the best teams in the history of Turkish football.

Results by round

See also
List of unbeaten football club seasons

External links
Turkish Soccer

Beşiktaş J.K. seasons
Besiktas
Turkish football championship-winning seasons